Clementina Batalla (1894-1987) was a Mexican lawyer, teacher and women's rights activist.

At age 20, Batalla was one of the first female law students in Mexico. In 1920, she was admitted as a lawyer in the National School of Jurisprudence, which made her the second lawyer received in her alma mater. Batalla founded the Union of Mexican Women, which in 1964 held its first Annual Congress.

References

1894 births
1987 deaths
20th-century Mexican lawyers
Mexican human rights activists
Women human rights activists